Melanophryniscus montevidensis is a species of toad in the family Bufonidae.
It is found in Brazil and Uruguay.
Its natural habitats are temperate shrubland, intermittent freshwater marshes, and sandy shores.
It is threatened by habitat loss.

References

montevidensis
Amphibians described in 1902
Taxonomy articles created by Polbot